St. Antony Church is a Roman Catholic church in Ujire, within the Belthangady Varado of the Diocese of Mangalore, India. 

As of October 2021, the parish had 261 families and 1097 members. The current church was built in 1969.

Administration 
The church has sponsored several notable institutions in Ujire.

 Anugraha English Medium School (Kindergarten, Primary, and High Schools)
 Anugraha PU College
 Dayalbagh Ashram
 Vimukthi Social Work Centre
 Mary Immaculate Convent

See also
Goan Catholics
Church Of Sacred Heart Of Jesus, Madanthyar
Christianity in Karnataka
Diocese of Belthangady
Most Holy Redeemer Church, Belthangady

References

Churches in Mangalore Diocese
Religious organizations established in 1885
1885 establishments in India
Roman Catholic churches completed in 1969